A Night of Horror International Film Festival is a horror genre film festival that is based in Sydney, Australia.

There seems to be some consensus that the event is Australia's premiere, and possibly only, horror film festival. In his monthly column in Encore Magazine, columnist Harvey Shore referred to the festival as "Australia's first horror film festival [it] recognises the past and gives the horror genre a platform for the future." In an article in Sydney's Drum Media magazine, journalist Liz Guiffre refers to the horror festival as "a one of a kind in our parts".

Festival history

The festival was founded in 2006, by Dean Bertram, Lisa Mitchell, and Grant Bertram. It was originally a short film festival, but has since expanded to include feature films and horror themed music videos. Indeed, now that the festival runs for a longer duration, the festival's name, "A Night of Horror", is actually something of a misnomer (the 2008 festival actually ran for ten days and nights). The principal screening venue for the 2008 festival was the Dendy Newtown Cinema. Additional special events included a horror filmmaking forum, a zombie walk, and a number of horror-themed parties.

In addition to the principal annual event in Sydney, a "best of" program of films from the festival tours within Australia and internationally. Some of these screenings take place at other festivals under the "A Night of Horror" banner, and have included programs at: It Came From Lake Michigan Film Festival, Weekend de la Peur, and Revelation Perth International Film Festival.

In 2007, A Night of Horror International Film Festival also programmed a special selection of Canadian produced horror films for Possible Worlds: Sydney's Canadian Film Festival (which took place at the Chauvel Cinema, Paddington).

Festival Judges and Winning Films

The festival is competitive and films compete for several awards and prizes. A panel of judges decide these winners. 2009 judges included: Antony I. Ginnane (IFM World Releasing, SPAA), Jon Dalgaard (International Coordinator, Lionsgate), Jason Di Rosso (ABC Radio National Movietime), Lewis Alsamari (actor UNITED 93, GREEN ZONE and writer). Previous year's judges have included film author and curator Jack Sargeant, People magazine editor Martin Vine, television and radio personalities Jaimie Leonarder and Aspasia Leonarder, and FBi Radio presenter and journalist Chris Ruhle.

2007 Winning films

Best of Fest: The Ancient Rite of Corey McGillis (AUS)

Best Film: Happy Birthday 2 You (ESP)

Best Animation: The Tell Tale Heart (LUX/ESP/USA)

Best Lovecraft Film: From Beyond (USA)

Best Zombie Film: Love is a Shotgun (AUS)

Best Director: Paul Campion, Night of the Hell Hamsters (UK/NZ)

Best Performance: Emma Caulfield, Hollow (USA)

Best Scream Queen: Kaja Trøa, The New Life (AUS)

Best Special Effects: Stuart Rowsell, The Ancient Rite of Corey McGillis (AUS)

Best Score: Milan Rusko, Nazdravicko! (SVK)

2008 Winning Films

Best Film: Brain Dead (USA)

Best Foreign Film: La Antena (ARG)

Best Short Film: Pumpkin Hell (USA)

Best Australian Film: When Sally Met Frank (AUS)

Best Lovecraft Film: The Call of Cthulhu (USA)

Best Animation: Egg Ghost (KOR/USA)

Best Music Video: Torture Device, featuring Dawn of Ashes (USA)

Best Director: Paco Limon, (Doctor Infierno) (ESP)

Best Performance: Sammi Davis, The Double Born (USA)

Best Scream Queen: Tess McVicker, Brain Dead (USA)

Best Special Make-Up Effects: Brain Dead (USA)

Best Special Visual Effects: Eel Girl (NZ/UK)

Directors' Choice Award (Best Feature Film): Murder Loves Killers Too (USA)

Directors' Choice Award (Best Short Film): Kirksdale (USA)

2009 Winning Films

Best Film: Splinter (USA)

Best Foreign Language Film: No Morire Sola (I'll Never Die Alone) (ARG)

Best Australian Film: I Know How Many Runs You Scored Last Summer (AUS)

Best Director: Adrián García Bogliano (I'll Never Die Alone) (ARG)

Best Australian Director: Ursula Dabrowsky (Family Demons) (AUS)

Best Female Performance: Olga Fedori (Mum & Dad) (UK)

Best Male Performance: Shea Whigham (Splinter) (USA)

Best Special Effects: Splinter (USA)

Best Special Effects (Short Film): Treevenge (CAN)

Best Short Film: Una Storia Di Lupi (A Wolf's Tale) (ITA)

Best Short Animation: The Facts in the Case of Mister Hollow (CAN)

Best Lovecraft Film: AM 1200 (USA)

Best Short Australian Film: A Break in the Monotony (AUS)

Best Music Video: More Control - The Heist and the Accomplice (Dir: Steve Daniels) (USA)

Directors' Choice (BEST FEATURE): Reel Zombies (CAN)

Directors' Choice (BEST SHORT): Allure (USA)

Independent Spirit Award (FEATURE FILM): Finale (USA)

Independent Spirit Award (SHORT): The Red Hours (CAN)

Independent Spirit Award (AUSTRALIA): Taber Corn (AUS)

2009 Festival

The 2009 Sydney festival is scheduled for 25 March to 3 April 2009.

On 2 June 2008, the festival announced its call for entries for the 2009 festival. The festival accepts films in several different categories, including: feature films, short films, animations, films inspired by the writings of H. P. Lovecraft, and horror-themed music videos.

It has also introduced a screenplay competition to take place in conjunction with the 2009 festival, and is calling for unproduced feature length and short horror scripts.

2009 Feature Screenplay Winners:

1st - Terminal - (Paul Campion & Elisabeth Pinto)

2nd - Children of the Night - (Harry Basil)

3rd - Footage - (Duncan Samarasinghe)

2009 Short Screenplay Winners:

1st - Brother Moose's Broken Shorts - (A.J. Mitchler)

2nd - Fragments of Normal - (Gwyn Duffy)

3rd - Mr. Roach - (Franck Zuanic)

References

External links
A Night of Horror International Film Festival website
A Night of Horror at Revelation Perth International Film Festival

Fantasy and horror film festivals
Film festivals in Sydney